Lemoyne (French: le moine) can refer to:

People
 Antoine Le Moyne de Châteauguay (1683–1747), French soldier and governor of Cayenne (French Guiana)
 Charles Le Moyne (actor) (1880–1956), American actor of the silent era
 Charles le Moyne de Longueuil et de Châteauguay (1626–1685), French settler in Canada
 Francis Julius LeMoyne (1798–1879), creator of first crematory in the United States
 François Lemoyne, (1688–1737), French rococo painter
 Jacques Le Moyne (c.1533–1588), French artist
 Jean-Louis Lemoyne (1665–1755), French sculptor
 Jean-Baptiste Le Moyne, Sieur de Bienville (1680–1767), colonizer and governor of French Louisiana
 Jean-Baptiste Lemoyne (1704–1778), French sculptor, son of Jean-Louis Lemoyne
 Jean-Baptiste Lemoyne (composer) (1751–1796), French composer
 Jean-Baptiste Lemoyne (politician) (born 1977), French politician
 John V. Le Moyne (1828–1918), U.S. Representative from Illinois  
 Pierre Le Moyne d'Iberville (1661–1706), founder of French Louisiana
 Sarah Cowell Le Moyne (1859–1915), American 19th century stage actress
 Serge Lemoyne (1941–1998), Canadian artist from Quebec
 Simon Le Moyne (1604–1665), French Jesuit missionary in Upper Canada and New York
 William J. Le Moyne (1831–1905), American 19th century stage actor

Places
 Le Moyne, Quebec, a neighbourhood in Longueuil, part of the borough of Le Vieux-Longueuil, and a former city, in Montérégie, Quebec, Canada
 Le Moyne River, a tributary of the St. Lawrence River, in Château-Richer, La Côte-de-Beaupré Regional County Municipality, Capitale-Nationale, Quebec, Canada
 Le Moyne, Alabama
 Lemoyne, Nebraska
 Lemoyne, Pennsylvania

Institutions
 Le Moyne College, Syracuse, New York
 LeMoyne-Owen College, Memphis, Tennessee

See also 
 Des Moines (disambiguation)